A list of films produced by the Marathi language film industry based in Maharashtra in the year 1944.

1944 Releases
A list of Marathi films released in 1944.

References

External links
Gomolo - 

Lists of 1944 films by country or language
1944
1944 in Indian cinema